"Indian Summer" is a song by Manic Street Preachers and was the fourth single released from their eighth studio album Send Away the Tigers. It peaked on number 22 in the UK Singles Chart.

Background

Nicky Wire mentioned around the time of Autumnsong's release, that "Indian Summer" was a strong candidate for the third single from the album, but was pushed back in favour of "Autumnsong".

On 1 August 2007 the official Manics' website reported that the band would soon be heading to studio in order to record b-sides for the single's release.

In an interview with Lauren Laverne on 6 August 2007 on BBC Radio 2, Wire said that James Dean Bradfield wasn't sure of "Indian Summer" as it sounded like "A Design for Life", to which Nicky said "well then, let's put it on the album".

Release

It reached number 22 in the UK Singles Chart, breaking an amazing run of 11 years where the band managed to chart all their singles in the Top 20 in the UK, starting with 1996's A Design for Life, and ending with Indian Summer.

Just prior to the release of the single, Nicky Wire said of the B-sides, "'Anorexic Rodin' - Randy Rhodes guitars - Holy Bible drums - super punky weirdness - 'Heyday Of The Blood' (band favourite at the moment) - very Who's Next/Quadrophenia - a useful experiment for the future - "Lady Lazarus" - its C86 time again - an ode to all the great female poets - early Primal Scream with soft vocals + lyrical flow - then a cover version of the great Beat Happening: "Foggy Eyes". A pure and just tribute to a band who were 100% indie. And finally another instrumental "You Know its Going To Hurt" - post rock drums prog rock guitars odd time signatures very strange - so hope you enjoy. As the great woman said 'The way I see it, if you want the rainbow, then you have to put up with the rain' - Dolly Parton".

Music video
The video for the single shot on Super-8 film was directed by Patrick Jones.

Track listing

2 Track CD single
"Indian Summer" - 3:54
"Anorexic Rodin" - 3:18

Maxi CD single
"Indian Summer" - 3:57
"Heyday of the Blood" - 2:44
"Foggy Eyes" (Beat Happening cover) - 2:53
"Lady Lazarus" - 4:09 (featuring lead vocals by Nicky Wire)

7" Limited edition
"Indian Summer" - 3:54
"You Know It's Going to Hurt" - 2:51 (instrumental)

Digital download
"Indian Summer" - 3:54
"Indian Summer" (Demo Version) - 3:49

Promo CD
"Indian Summer" - 3:58
"Indian Summer" (Instrumental) - 3:56

When purchased as a bundle (2 Track CD Single, Maxi CD Single and 7" Limited Edition), the single included a set of four postcards featuring artwork by Valerie Phillips, with quotes on the reverse. One postcard per bundle was signed by the band.

Charts

References

2007 singles
Manic Street Preachers songs
Song recordings produced by Dave Eringa
Songs written by Nicky Wire
Songs written by James Dean Bradfield
Songs written by Sean Moore (musician)
2007 songs
Columbia Records singles